Goldbaum is a surname. Notable people with the surname include:

David Goldbaum (1858–1930), Mexican surveyor and politician
Marcus Goldbaum (1835–1886), Prussian-born American pioneer and prospector
Meshulam Zalman Goldbaum (1836–1915), Hebrew writer and playwright
 (1843–1912), German author

See also
Goldblum